is a Japanese anime series produced by Sunrise, Mainichi Broadcasting System, and Project Geass. The first season, entitled , premiered on Mainichi Broadcasting System on October 6, 2006, and was broadcast by a total of ten stations. Its final two episodes were aired on July 29, 2007. Its final episode aired on September 28, 2008.

Since its premiere in Japan, Lelouch of the Rebellion and R2 were licensed by Bandai Entertainment and dubbed by ZRO Limit Productions. Lelouch of the Rebellion premiered on Adult Swim on April 27, 2008, and R2 on November 2, 2008. The two seasons were then distributed by Beez Entertainment and Kazé in the United Kingdom and licensed by Madman Entertainment in Australia. Both seasons have also received localizations in other languages such as French, German, Italian, and Tagalog.

Following Lelouch of the Rebellion and R2 were four individual original video animations (OVA), and an OVA series titled .

Series overview

Episode list

Season 1: Lelouch of the Rebellion (2006–07)

Season 2: Lelouch of the Rebellion R2 (2008)

Individual OVAs

Code Geass: Akito the Exiled
Code Geass: Akito the Exiled is a series of side-story OVAs that canonically take place between both seasons of Code Geass.

Films

Notes

References

Code Geass